Kicked Out may refer to:

 Kicked Out (film), a 1918 short comedy film
 Kicked Out (book), a 2010 anthology compiled and edited by Sassafras Lowrey